is a Japanese football player who currently plays for Thespakusatsu Gunma.

Career
Born in Niigata City, Hiramatsu started his career with his hometown club Albirex Niigata, joining the club at the age of 12. He progressed through the youth system at the club and signed his first professional contract in 2014.
He made his professional debut starting on 7 March 2015 in a 2-1 J1 League match loss to Sagan Tosu.

Club statistics
Updated to 23 February 2020.

References

External links
Profile at Albirex Niigata
 
 

1992 births
Living people
Kokushikan University alumni
Association football people from Niigata Prefecture
Japanese footballers
J1 League players
J2 League players
J3 League players
Albirex Niigata players
Mito HollyHock players
V-Varen Nagasaki players
Kataller Toyama players
SC Sagamihara players
Association football forwards